The Faraday Institution is a British research institute aiming to advance battery science and technology. It was established in 2017 as part of the UK's wider Faraday Battery Challenge.  It states its mission as having four key areas: "electrochemical energy storage research, skills development, market analysis and early-stage commercialisation". The Institution is headquartered at the Harwell Science and Innovation Campus near Oxford.  It is a limited company and is a registered charity with an independent board of trustees.

Name 

The Faraday Institution is named after Michael Faraday, an English scientist who contributed to the basic understanding of electromagnetism and electrochemistry. He popularised the now common battery terminology "anode", "cathode", "electrode" and "ion". Faraday  lectured on education at the Royal Institution in 1854 and appeared before a Public Schools Commission to give his views on education in Great Britain. Between 1827 and 1860 at the Royal Institution, Faraday presented nineteen Christmas lectures for young people. The Royal Institution Christmas Lectures series continues today, broadcast on the BBC.

Following this tradition, the Faraday Institution runs education and public engagement activities. In 2019, it launched a public discussion series on batteries with the Royal Institution and continued the programme in 2020, 2021 and 2022.

Research programmes 

The Faraday Institution currently focuses on research in lithium-ion batteries, "beyond" lithium-ion battery technologies and energy storage for emerging economies. Research is conducted in multidisciplinary teams with expertise that ranges across chemical engineering, chemistry, data and computer science, mechanical engineering, electrical engineering, law, materials science, maths and physics.

Lithium ion 
 Battery degradation
 Multi-scale modelling 
 Battery recycling and reuse 
 Electrode manufacturing 
 Cathode materials 
 Battery safety

Beyond Lithium ion 
 Solid-state batteries 
 Sodium-ion batteries
 Lithium-sulfur batteries

Batteries for Emerging Economies 
With funding from the FCDO, in 2020 the Faraday Institution commenced research on battery technologies for use in developing countries and emerging economies. 
 Soluble lead flow batteries
 Graphite polysulphide single liquid flow batteries

Founding universities and participating universities 
The Faraday Institution was founded by seven universities:
 Imperial College London
 Newcastle University
 University College London
 University of Cambridge
 University of Oxford
 University of Southampton
 University of Warwick

The Faraday Institution's research projects are competitive and open to all academic battery researchers and research groups in the UK.

In 2020, university participants included the following:	 
 Imperial College London
 Cardiff University
 Coventry University
 Lancaster University
 Newcastle University
 University College London
 University of Cambridge
 University of Oxford	
 University of Southampton
 University of Warwick
 University of Bath
 University of Birmingham
 University of Cambridge
 University of Edinburgh	
 University of Leicester	
 University of Liverpool	
 University of Manchester	
 University of Nottingham	
 University of Oxford
 University of Portsmouth
 University of Sheffield 
 University of Southampton	
 University of St. Andrews	
 University of Surrey	
 University of Warwick

Impacts on policy 

The Faraday Institution publishes white papers and reports to inform both government and industry on energy storage science, technology, economics, supply chains and employment. Its report on UK battery demand was used to evidence the requirement for UK based automotive battery gigafactories and the need for the Automotive Transformation Fund (ATF) to support establishing them.

Battery Sustainability, Recycling and Reuse 
The Faraday Institution participates in international efforts on sustainability and the recycling and reuse of lithium-ion batteries in emerging economies and developing countries. An effort with NREL as part of the World Bank Energy Storage Partnership led to the 2020 publication of "Global Overview of Energy Storage Performance Test Protocols" that provides support and knowledge across the developing world on opportunities and technologies for energy storage in the electric sector. It contributed to the 2020 study "Reuse and Recycling: Environmental Sustainability of Lithium-Ion Battery Energy Storage Systems", which offers an assessment of the role developing countries can play in this area.

It is a member of the World Economic Forum Global Battery Alliance, an international consortium focused on a circular economy and sustainable value chain for batteries and contributed to the 2019 report "A Vision for a Sustainable Battery Value Chain in 2030."

Outreach and education 

The Faraday Institution maintains outreach and education programmes that extend across STEM, undergraduate attraction, doctoral training and early career professional development to generate trained battery scientists and engineers.

To ensure the public has the best information on the opportunities and challenges of energy storage, and that future generations of scientists and engineers from all backgrounds are inspired to pursue promising STEM careers, the Faraday Institution has engaged delivery partners including the Royal Institution, SEO London, WISE Campaign, The Curiosity Box and the Primary Science Teaching Trust (PSTT).

Notable scientists associated with the Faraday Institution 
Peter Littlewood, Chair of the Board of Trustees
Pamela Thomas, Chief Executive Officer
Sir Peter Bruce, Chief Scientist
Dame Clare Grey, Principal Investigator 
Serena Corr, Principal Investigator
Saiful Islam, Principal Investigator
Kristina Edström, Trustee

References

External links

Battery (electricity)
Lithium-ion batteries
Research institutes in England
2017 establishments in the United Kingdom
Energy storage
Battery recycling
Grid energy storage
Research institutes in Oxfordshire
Research and development in the United Kingdom